Parliamentary elections were held in Croatia on 5 July 2020. They were the tenth parliamentary elections since the first multi-party elections in 1990 and elected the 151 members of the Croatian Parliament. 140 Members of Parliament were elected from geographical electoral districts in Croatia, three MPs were chosen by the Croatian diaspora and eight MPs came from the ranks of citizens registered as belonging to any of the 22 constitutionally recognized national minorities.

During April 2020, there had been widespread media speculation that the election would be called earlier than originally planned, due to the uncertainty created by the still-ongoing worldwide pandemic of coronavirus disease 2019 (COVID-19). Namely, though the spread of the virus had been brought under control by that time, fears still persisted that the number of infected cases could once again begin to rise in autumn and that this could, therefore, impede or even prevent the holding of the election. Thus, several prominent members of the Croatian Democratic Union (HDZ) – the senior partner in the ruling coalition, (including Speaker of the Parliament Gordan Jandroković) had voiced their support for the proposal that the elections be held some time during the summer. In addition, in early May several sources from within both the ruling HDZ and the opposition Social Democratic Party (SDP) stated that parliament could be dissolved as early as mid-May, with elections then taking place in late June or early July. On 14 May 2020, Prime Minister Andrej Plenković confirmed that the government had indeed reached an agreement with the parliamentary opposition on the holding of an early election and the dissolution of parliament thus took place on 18 May. This entailed that President Zoran Milanović had to formally call the election by 17 July 2020 at the latest.

In the elections, the ruling Christian-democratic HDZ faced its main challenge from the centre-left Restart Coalition chaired by SDP leader Davor Bernardić, which consists of the SDP and several smaller parties (such as the Croatian Peasant Party, Civic-Liberal Alliance, Croatian Party of Pensioners and Istrian Democratic Assembly). In addition, opinion polls had shown that a conservative coalition led by 2019 presidential candidate Miroslav Škoro – consisting of Škoro's own Homeland Movement party, some of the parties of the Croatian Sovereignists coalition and several other smaller right-wing parties – would become the third-largest grouping in parliament, while the centre-right Bridge of Independent Lists (Most) – which finished a strong third in both the 2015 and 2016 elections, and which had supported Škoro's presidential campaign, could be reduced to the role of a minor parliamentary party. Also, the Green–Left Coalition, consisting of We Can!, the New Left, the Worker's Front, ORaH, Zagreb is OURS and For the City, were expected to enter the parliament for the first time.

The ruling HDZ obtained an upset victory over the Restart Coalition, who had previously been leading in opinion polls for several weeks prior to the elections.

Background
In the previous parliamentary election, held on 11 September 2016, the center-right Croatian Democratic Union (HDZ) won an upset plurality of seats - receiving 61 MPs in the parliament, while the opposition People's Coalition won 54 seats. Therefore, HDZ chairman Andrej Plenković began talks on the formation of a governing majority with the third-placed Bridge of Independent Lists (Most) party, as well as with MPs representing national minorities. Meanwhile, as a result of the defeat of his coalition the SDP chairman (and People's Coalition Prime Ministerial candidate), Zoran Milanović, announced his withdrawal from politics. A few weeks after the election, HDZ and Most successfully concluded their coalition talks and agreed to form a government that would rely on the outside support of the 8 Members of Parliament representing the national minorities. As a result, on 10 October 2016, Plenković presented 91 signatures of support from MPs to President Kolinda Grabar-Kitarović and she, therefore, proceeded to give him a 30-day mandate (expiring on 9 November 2016) to form a government. Thereafter, Parliament formally convened on 14 October 2016 with the election of Most chairman Božo Petrov as a Speaker, while a parliamentary vote held on 19 October 2016 confirmed the proposed Cabinet of Andrej Plenković by a vote of 91 in favor, 45 against and 3 abstentions. Thus, Plenković became the 12th Prime Minister of Croatia, while his cabinet became the fourteenth to hold the office since the first multi-party election took place in 1990 – while Croatia was still a constituent republic of SFR Yugoslavia.

Most left the governing coalition in April 2017, amid a disagreement with the HDZ over Finance Minister Zdravko Marić's alleged withholding of information relating to financial irregularities in Agrokor - one of Croatia's largest firms, which had brought about a crisis due to Agrokor not being able to pay back its loans. Thus, as the HDZ-led government was left without a clear parliamentary majority (and a no-confidence vote in Marić was only narrowly avoided by a 75–75 split vote in Parliament), the possibility of an early election (the third in 18 months) greatly increased during May. However, in June the Plenković government managed to regain a parliamentary majority by forming a new cabinet, which included members of the center-left Croatian People's Party - Liberal Democrats (HNS-LD). Yet, the decision to enter into government with the HDZ - made by the HNS-LD's central body, was quite unexpected and thus immediately created a split within the HNS-LD. Namely, only five of the party's nine MPs decided to support the newly-formed coalition, while the remaining four (including former party chair Vesna Pusić) opted instead to form a new political party - named the Civic-Liberal Alliance (Glas), and remain in the opposition.

Prime Minister Andrej Plenković and his HDZ party have faced criticism from numerous activists, public figures and political opponents for allegedly dissolving the Parliament several months in advance in order to avoid holding elections during a major economic crisis (caused by the COVID-19 pandemic), which is expected to have a severe impact on Croatia in autumn, once the financial losses in the tourism sector are included in economic projections.

Many citizens of Zagreb have accused the government and the ruling HDZ party of leaving them unprotected for several months by dissolving the Parliament and by failing to adopt the necessary legal measures to deal with the earthquake damage before doing so. Namely, instead of pursuing the adoption of a set of emergency laws, the government has decided to delay any new legal framework on this issue by at least 3 to 6 months. This caused activists from several public platforms - mainly from Green-Left coalition, to gathered on St. Mark's Square on 17 May 2020, where they remained for 24 hours in order to protest against the resolution on the early dissolution of parliament.

As soon as parliament was dissolved the HDZ's local branch in the city of Vukovar (the site of one of the most major and emotionally symbolic battles in the Croatian War of Independence) decided to cut its ties with the party's central organization, claiming that they felt that their city has been misused for political gain and that the government had also failed to provide it with opportunities for economic development. Thus, this former branch of the HDZ will contest the election as part of some other coalition.

Outgoing 9th Assembly of Parliament
The following is a partisan makeup of the 9th Assembly of the Croatian Parliament as of 18 May 2020:

On 18 May 2020, the 9th Assembly dissolved itself by a vote of 105 in favor.

Electoral system

The 151 members of the Croatian Parliament are elected from 10 geographical and two special electoral districts: 
140 seats are elected in ten geographical 14-seat electoral districts (1st–10th Electoral Districts) by open list proportional representation (using a 5% electoral threshold) with seats allocated using the d'Hondt method
3 seats are elected in a special electoral district (11th Electoral District) for Croatian citizens living abroad  
8 seats are elected from an electoral district for national minorities (12th Electoral District): 3 seats for Serbian, 1 seat for Italian, 1 seat for Hungarian, 1 seat for Czech and Slovak, 1 seat for Albanian, Bosnian, Macedonian, Montenegrin and Slovenian, and 1 seat for Austrian, Bulgarian, German, Jewish, Polish, Roma, Romanian, Rusyn, Russian, Turkish, Ukrainian and Vlach national minority

Opinion polls

Seat predictions

Results

The ruling HDZ obtained an upset victory over the Restart Coalition, who had previously been leading in opinion polls for several weeks prior to the elections. The HDZ likely received a boost from public approval over its handling of the COVID-19 pandemic. The pandemic also caused voter turnout to be the lowest since the first democratic elections in 1990, with under half of registered voters participating.

Results by constituency

Aftermath

Acknowledging his party's defeat in the legislative elections, Davor Bernardić stepped down as the leader of Social Democrats.

On 6 July 2020, HDZ leader Andrej Plenković announced that he had collected the support of the necessary 76 MPs needed to form a government, following coalition negotiations. He announced that he had received support from his party and allies, the HNS – LD, the NS-R, and all 8 representatives of the national minorities.

See also
2020 in Croatia
COVID-19 pandemic in Croatia

Notes

References

External links

Parliamentary election
Elections in Croatia
Parliamentary
Croatia